The Petit Col Ferret (or Col du Petit Ferret) is an Alpine pass between the canton of Valais and the Aosta Valley.

Features 
The pass stands on the main chain of the Alps at an elevation of 2,490 m.  It separates the Mont Blanc Massif (thus the Graian Alps) from the Pennine Alps. 

In spite of this peculiarity, it is less known and frequented than the neighbouring Col du Grand Ferret (often simply named as Col Ferret), which is located South of the Petit Col Ferret on the route of the Tour du Mont Blanc. The two passes are divided by the modest elevation of the Tête de Ferret (2,714 m).

Access 
The pass is located on the access route to the Fiorio hut at 2,274 m), which can be used as a foothold for ascents and hikes around the Pré de Bar glacier. Both the accesses from Italy and from Switzerland are more challenging than the ones to the Col du Grand Ferret.

See also
 List of mountain passes

References 

Mountain passes of Valais
Mountain passes of Aosta Valley
Mountain passes of the Alps
Italy–Switzerland border crossings